The Solomon Fussell Farm is located  east of Pendleton, Madison County, Indiana on State Road 38 at the junction of county road 150 West. The main feature is a -story log house built by Samuel Fussell in 1832. Extensive later additions have been attached to the rear. Also existent are out buildings including a barn.

The Fussell family were members of the local  Quaker community. Several members of the Fussell family are buried in the cemetery of the nearby Fall Creek Meeting House.

It was listed on the National Register of Historic Places in 1992 and delisted in 2011.

References

 Historic American Buildings Survey in Indiana, edited by Thomas M. Slade, copyright 1983, page 93

External links
 National Register of Historic Places - http://www.nationalregisterofhistoricplaces.com/IN/Madison/state.html

Pendleton, Indiana
Former National Register of Historic Places in Indiana
Farms on the National Register of Historic Places in Indiana
National Register of Historic Places in Madison County, Indiana
Buildings and structures in Madison County, Indiana